Tumarkhad is a village in Achham District in the Seti Zone of western Nepal. According to the 1991 Nepal census, the village had a population of 2450 living in 485 houses. According to the 2001 Nepal census, the population was 3366, of which 23% was literate.
Turmakhand is one of the most beautiful place in Achham, district.

References

Populated places in Achham District
Village development committees in Achham District